Chiropsalmus quadrumanus, commonly known as the four-handed box jellyfish, is a species of box jellyfish found in the western Atlantic Ocean, the Gulf of Mexico and the Pacific Ocean. The sting is venomous and dangerous to humans, especially children.

Taxonomy
Little and/or poor taxonomic research has been conducted on Chiropsalmus quadrumanus. In 2006, Lisa-ann Gershwin noted that the South American neotype's cnidome was differing from the United States species. Several studies on the species have been conducted since then. One in 1975 gives statistics and charts that clearly shows the differing cnidomes of U.S. species compared to that of the neotype of Gershwin's. No new taxa have been erected to accommodate the research.

Description
The body is composed of a gelatinous material and the top edges are rounded while the top surface is flat. Bundles of 7 to 9 tentacles dangle from pedalia, palmate appendages at the four lower corners of the bell, with a tentacle on each "finger". Halfway up the inside of the bell is the velarium, a horizontal ring of tissue partially blocking the aperture. The manubrium is a central column hanging down inside the bell with the mouth at its tip. The rounded stomach  has four pouches connecting to radial sinuses along the edges of the bell. The gonads are on either side of the radial canals.

Distribution and habitat
Chiropsalmus quadrumanus is found on the east coast of North America in North and South Carolina, Georgia, Florida, Alabama, Mississippi, Louisiana, Texas, the Caribbean, the Gulf of Mexico and Mexico, and a disjunct population in Brazil. It also occurs in the Pacific Ocean and has been reported from Hawaii and Australia. It is usually found in the warm, open seas but it is sometimes found inshore in large numbers in places where it has not been previously found. When this happened on the Texas Gulf coast in 1955 and 1956, it coincided with drought conditions and an associated high salinity level in the area. The jellyfish were seldom seen near the surface but small specimens were frequently taken in shrimp trawls. After gales large quantities were washed up on the beach, and after heavy rains, many dead jellyfish were found floating on the surface. When conditions returned to normal, the jellyfish disappeared.

Toxicity
The long tentacles of Chiropsalmus quadrumanus are armed with nematocysts, the purpose of which is to capture prey such as small fish and to deter predators. They can inflict an extremely painful sting on people that encounter them. There is a documented case of a four-year-old boy in the Gulf of Mexico dying within forty minutes of being stung. Of forty-nine people stung by jellyfish off the coast of Brazil over a five-year period, twenty were by identifiable species. Sixteen of these were identified as being caused by Chiropsalmus quadrumanus and four by the Portuguese man o' war (Physalia physalis). All these stings were linear in nature, causing both intense pain and systemic symptoms. Apart from pain, the symptoms include cardiac dysfunction and respiratory depression. The rash lasts for several months. Antivenom administered within a few hours relieves the pain somewhat, reduces the severity of the rash, and improves other symptoms. In extreme cases, cardiopulmonary resuscitation can be effective if started promptly.

References

Chiropsalmidae
Cnidarians of the Atlantic Ocean
Cnidarians of the Caribbean Sea
Cnidarians of the Pacific Ocean
Animals described in 1859
Taxa named by Fritz Müller